Brad Dalke (born August 19, 1997) is an American amateur golfer.

Dalke was born in Yukon, Oklahoma and currently plays golf at the University of Oklahoma. He led the Sooners to the 2017 NCAA Championship at Rich Harvest Farms in Sugar Grove, Illinois.

In 2015, Dalke won the Junior PGA Championship and earned an exemption into the 2016 Valero Texas Open, where he missed the cut.

Dalke finished runner-up to Curtis Luck at the 2016 U.S. Amateur, thus earning invitations into the 2017 Masters Tournament and the 2017 U.S. Open.

Amateur wins
2011 Thunderbird International Junior
2013 HP Boys, PING Invitational
2015 Junior PGA Championship
2017 NCAA Stanford Regional
2018 UTSA-Lone Star Invitational

Source:

Results in major championships

CUT = missed the half-way cut

U.S. national team appearances
Junior Ryder Cup: 2014 (winners)
Eisenhower Trophy: 2016
Arnold Palmer Cup: 2018 (winners)

References

American male golfers
Amateur golfers
Oklahoma Sooners men's golfers
Golfers from Oklahoma
People from Yukon, Oklahoma
1997 births
Living people